The Tyrrell P34 (Project 34), commonly known as the "six-wheeler", was a Formula One (F1) race car designed by Derek Gardner, Tyrrell's chief designer. The car used four specially manufactured 10-inch diameter (254 mm) wheels and tyres at the front, with two ordinary-sized wheels at the back.

The P34 was introduced in September 1975 and began racing in the 1976 season. It proved successful and led other teams to begin design of six-wheeled platforms of their own. Changes to the design made for the 1977 season made it uncompetitive and the concept was abandoned for Tyrrell's 1978 season. The other six-wheeled designs ended development and F1 rules later stipulated that cars must have four wheels in total. The cars later had some success in various "classics" race events, but today are museum pieces.

Design
For the mid-1970s, F1 stipulated that the maximum width of the front wing was 1.5 m. Considering the needed room for the driver's feet, the steering mechanism, suspension and the normal front tyre size, this meant the front tyres projected above and out to the sides of the wing. P34's basic concept was to use a tyre that would be small enough to fit entirely behind the wing. This would have two effects; one would be to lower overall drag and thus improve speed on straights and the other was to clean up overall aerodynamics so the rear wing would receive cleaner airflow.

This had too small a contact patch to offer reasonable cornering performance, which led to the use of four wheels instead of two. Adding more wheels also had the advantage of offering more total brake area. The downside was increased complexity of the steering system and a physically larger suspension system. The steering complexity was solved by connecting only the front pair of wheels to the steering wheel and connecting the rear set to the front with a bell crank. Initially considered to be a problem area, Joel Rosinsky later declared that "The steering is so gentle and absolutely free of reaction that you might have thought it was power-assisted!"

The new design was unveiled at the Heathrow Hotel in late September 1975. The car was initially kept under a tarpaulin with hoops over the wheels to make it look conventional, leading to astonishment when the tarp was pulled off. Some in the audience were convinced the design was a publicity stunt. The car first took to the track at Silverstone on 8 October 1975, and, after more tests, Tyrrell decided to build two more examples with a slightly longer wheelbase to race in the 1976 season.

Race history

Both Jody Scheckter and Patrick Depailler produced good results with the car, but while Depailler praised the car continually, Scheckter was unimpressed. The P34's golden moment came in the Swedish Grand Prix. Scheckter and Depailler finished first and second, and to date Scheckter is the only driver ever to win a race in a six-wheeled car. The car seemed to be particularly good down the straights and through long corners, like at Anderstorp, Watkins Glen, Mosport Park, Fuji and the Österreichring, but it struggled on bumpy circuits like Brands Hatch, Jarama and the Nürburgring, where the grip was actually variable, because, depending upon the contours or bumps on the track, one of the front small tires would touch the road, but the one in front or behind it on the same side would not. Scheckter left the team at the end of the season, insisting that the six-wheeler was "a piece of junk".

For 1977, Scheckter was replaced by Ronnie Peterson, and the P34 was redesigned for cleaner aerodynamics, and some redesign was done on Peterson's car to accommodate his height. The P34B was wider and heavier than before, and, although Peterson was able to string some promising results from the P34B, as was Depailler, it was clear the car was not as good as before. Tyrrell blamed the problems on the increased weight, now  over the  F1 minimum. This placed more strain on the brakes and made it struggle through the corners. Others have blamed Goodyear's failure to properly develop the small front tyres. Late in the season, an attempt to address the handling was made by increasing the track of the front suspension, but this moved the tyres out from their original hidden position, essentially eliminating the whole advantage of the concept.

In November 1977, Tyrrell introduced his car for the 1978 season, and it had a conventional layout. He commented, "In the meantime, we have closed the book on our six-wheeled project, and I am sure the cars will become something of a collector's piece". Tyrrell kept the frame that Scheckter won on and sold the rest.

Today
More recently, the P34 has been a popular sight at historic racing events,  proving competitive once more. This was made possible when the Avon tyre company agreed to manufacture bespoke 10-inch tyres for Simon Bull, the owner of chassis No. 6. In 1999 and 2000, the resurrected P34 competed at a number of British and European circuits as an entrant in the FIA Thoroughbred Grand Prix series. Driven by Martin Stretton, the car won the TGP series outright in 2000, Chassis No.5 repeating that success in 2008 in the hands of Mauro Pane; this example is now owned by Pierluigi Martini alongside chassis number 2. Stretton also achieved numerous pole positions and class wins at the Grand Prix Historique de Monaco. The P34 has also been seen a number of times at the Goodwood Festival of Speed.

Other six-wheeled Formula One cars
While the Tyrrell P34 is the most widely known six-wheeled F1 car, it was not the only one.  The March Engineering, Williams and Scuderia Ferrari teams also built experimental six-wheeled F1 chassis; however, all of these had four wheels at the back rather than at the front like the P34.  The Williams FW07D and FW08B, and the March 2-4-0, had tandem rear wheels, which reduced drag by using the smaller front wheels and tyres in place of the typical larger rear wheels.  The Ferrari 312T6 featured the four rear wheels on a single axle.  This was similar to how Auto Union increased traction with its Type-D Grand Prix cars in the 1930s.  Despite extensive testing, neither the March, Williams, nor the Ferrari, were ever raced.  In 1983, the FIA prohibited cars with four driven wheels from competing. Later, the Formula 1 regulations required four as the maximum number of wheels allowed.

Complete Formula One World Championship results
(key) (Results in bold indicate pole position; results in italics indicate fastest lap.)

* 13 points in  scored using the Tyrrell 007

In media
The Tyrrell P34 was featured in the cartoon The Transformers as the vehicle converted into the Decepticon Stunticon known as Drag Strip. The car, shown sporting a yellow livery with red accents, was depicted as still being active in automotive races, despite the fact that the episode wherein it was stolen was produced and set in the mid-eighties.

The race car also made an appearance in the first episode of the 1993 anime series Moldiver and the 2013 film Rush.

Lupin is seen racing a version of the car in season 1 episode 11 of Lupin the Third Part II - "Bet on the Monaco Grand Prix (Who's Vroomin Who?)".

See also

 Ferrari 312T6
 March 2-4-0
 Williams FW07D
 Williams FW08B

References

External links

 Project 34 history website
 Article, Tech. Spec. gallery

Tyrrell 007.5  
Six-wheeled vehicles